Melphina flavina, the yellow forest swift, is a butterfly in the family Hesperiidae. It is found in Sierra Leone, Ivory Coast, Ghana, Togo, Nigeria, Cameroon, the Democratic Republic of the Congo and Uganda. The habitat consists of forests.

References

Butterflies described in 1965
Erionotini